"Triple Threat" is a song recorded by Canadian country music artist Rick Tippe. It was released in 1999 as the first single from his third studio album, Shiver 'n' Shake. It peaked at number 12 on the RPM Country Tracks chart in May 1999.

Chart performance

Year-end charts

References

1999 songs
1999 singles
Rick Tippe songs